Hendrik Petrus Venter (born 27 March 1992) is a South African rugby union player for the  in Super Rugby, having previously played for the  from 2015 to 2019. His regular position is flanker.

Career

Youth

Venter first played for Free State at the 2005 Under-13 Craven Week tournament. In 2008, he played for them in the 2008 Under-16 Grant Khomo Week and made it into an Under-16 Elite squad. He also played in the 2009 Academy Week.

He was named in a Varsity Cup Dream Team at the conclusion of the 2015 Varsity Cup tournament which played one match against the South Africa Under-20s in Stellenbosch.

Free State Cheetahs / Cheetahs

He was also included in their squad for the 2013 Currie Cup Premier Division competition.

In July 2014, Venter signed a new contract with the  until the end of 2015.

Personal

Venter is the nephew of the late n international rugby player Ruben Kruger.

References

South African rugby union players
Living people
1992 births
Rugby union players from Bloemfontein
Free State Cheetahs players
Cheetahs (rugby union) players
Alumni of Grey College, Bloemfontein
Rugby union flankers
Afrikaner people
Toshiba Brave Lupus Tokyo players
Sharks (rugby union) players
Sharks (Currie Cup) players